Wenlock Hill is the second album by Merrymouth, a folk band featuring Simon Fowler and Dan Sealey from Ocean Colour Scene, and Adam Barry. It was released in May 2014 and entered the UK Official Album Charts at #71.

Track listing
All songs are written by Simon Fowler, unless stated

 "Wenlock Hill"
 "Salt Breeze"
 "Blink of an Eye" (Sealey)
 "Being Without You"
 "I Am the Resurrection" (Ian Brown, John Squire) 
 "That Man"
 "Teashop Serande"
 "Duchess" (The Stranglers)
 "He Was a Friend of Mine" (Traditional, new words and arrangement Jim McGuinn with additional lyrics by Fowler, Sealey, Barry) 
 "If You Follow"
 "The Ragged Spiral" (Fowler, Sealey)

The lyrics to the song "He Was a Friend of Mine" have been adapted to be about the killing of John Lennon.

Personnel
Simon Fowler – vocals, acoustic guitar
Dan Sealey – vocals, guitars
Adam Barry – piano, Hammond organ, accordion, vocals
John McCusker – violins
Chas Hodges – piano

References

2012 debut albums
Merrymouth (band) albums
Albums recorded at Rockfield Studios